The Khokhar Khanzada  is
a Muslim community found mainly in the Nagaur District of Rajasthan and Fatehpur district of Uttar Pradesh in India. They have no connection with the Ranghar Khokhar of Moradabad district in western Uttar Pradesh, another community of Muslim Khokhars settled in Uttar Pradesh. The Khokhar are a well known tribe, found mainly in the Punjab region of Pakistan and India. The Khokhar Khanzada are a sub-community within the larger Khanzada community of eastern Uttar Pradesh.

Customs and traditions
They are Sunni Muslims,  and have customs similar to other Khanzada communities in the region. The community is largely endogamous, although there are cases of intermarriage with the Gautam Khanzada, a neighbouring Muslim Rajput population. But most marriages are with a close kin, with the community practicing both parallel cousin and cross cousin marriages. The community speak Urdu, as well as the Awadhi dialect.

Khokhar Ranghar
The town of Sambhal in Moradabad District is also home to several families of Khokhars, who have said to have emigrated from Gujrat in what is now Pakistani Punjab during the reign of the Mughal Emperor Babar. As most Rajput converts to Islam were in common parlance referred to as Ranghar, these Khokhars were also referred to as the Khokhar. The Emperor Babar himself is said to have granted the Khokhars jagir for the town of the Sambhal. They played a particularly important role in Rohilkhand politics during the period of Rohilla rule. The Khokhar were the effective rulers of the town of Sambhal and the adjoining countryside until the establishment of British rule after the Rohilla War of 1774. Although the Khokhars lost independent power, they remained one of the larger landowners in the district till 1949, when the newly independent India carried out substantive land reform, and broke up the large estates. The Khokhars remain a substantial element in the population of Sambhal.

References

Khanzada
Rajput clans
Social groups of Uttar Pradesh
Muslim communities of Uttar Pradesh
Muhajir communities